Southeast Maluku Regency is a regency of Maluku, Indonesia. It is coincident with the Kei Islands, except that the city of Tual, although within the Kei Islands geographically and the seat of the Regency's administration, is technically independent of the Regency. The land area of the Regency is 1,031.81 km2, while the sea area administered by the regency was 3,181 km2; it had a population of 96,442 at the 2010 Census; this increased to 121,511 at the 2020 Census. The capital is located in Langgur.

Administrative Districts 
At the time of the 2010 Census the regency was divided into six districts (kecamatan), but by 2016 five additional districts had been created by the division of the existing districts. These are tabulated below with their land and sea areas and their populations at the 2010 Census and the 2020 Census. The table also includes the location of the district administrative centres, the number of administrative villages in each district (a total of 185 rural desa and 6 urban kelurahan) and its postal code.

Notes: (a) includes 33 offshore islands. (b) includes 16 offshore islands. (c) includes 2 offshore islands. (d) the 2010 population of Hoat Sorbay and Manyeuw Districts were included in the figure for Kei Kecil District, from which they were split off. (e) the 2010 population of Kei Kecil Timur Selatan District was included in the figure for Kei Kecil Timur District, from which it was split off. (f) includes 10 offshore islands. (g) includes 3 offshore islands. (h) includes 8 offshore islands. (i) the 2010 population of Kei Besar Utara Barat District was included in the figure for Kei Besar District, from which it was split off. (j) the 2010 population of Kei Besar Selatan Barat District was included in the figure for Kei Besar Selatan District, from which it was split off.

Transport

A small airport named Dumatubun Airport located in Langgur urban midwest.

Climate
Langgur, the seat of the regency has a tropical rainforest climate (Af) with moderate rainfall from July to October and heavy to very heavy rainfall from November to June.

Riots

On 6 October and 12 November 2022, there were riots between the Elat village and Bombai village. The second riot that occurred on 12 November killed two people and injured dozens of civilians and two policemen.

References

External links 

Regencies of Maluku (province)